Victims of Yalta (British title) or The Secret Betrayal (American title) is a 1977 book by Nikolai Tolstoy that chronicles the fate of Soviet citizens who had been under German control during World War II and at its end fallen into the hands of the Western Allies. According to the secret Moscow agreement from 1944 that was confirmed  at the 1945 Yalta conference, all citizens of the Soviet Union were to be repatriated  without choice—a death sentence for many by execution or extermination through labour.

Contents
Tolstoy describes the various groups of over five million Russians who had fallen into German hands. These include prisoners of war, forced laborers (Ostarbeiter), collaborators, refugees, émigrés, and anti-communists. Conditions in Germany for Soviet prisoners were appalling and their mortality rate high, making it attractive for many to join laborers, Russian auxiliary troops, or the Russian Liberation Army (ROA). The situation for Russian soldiers was complicated by the stance of the Soviet government that rejected efforts by the International Red Cross to intervene and considered anyone who had surrendered to the enemy a traitor. The Moscow conference of 1944 and the Yalta agreement laid the groundwork for the participation of the British and American governments to support the repatriation program of the Soviet government. Tolstoy was especially critical of Anthony Eden's role in trying to appease the Soviets.

In his book, Tolstoy describes the fate of various groups:
 Russians in German service who were captured in North Africa, Italy, and France after the Normandy landing consisted usually of forced-labour contingents or, after Normandy, also of  Russians fighting within the context of the German Army. The repatriation process resulted in their execution or transport to labor camps, such as Vorkuta.
 Cossacks from the Don, Kuban, and Terek, and a number of groups from the Caucasus had resisted the Soviets during the Russian Civil War, had been persecuted under Joseph Stalin, and when German troops came in 1942 hoped to be able to resume their struggle with German help. During the German retreat they moved westwards with their families and ended up at the end of the war in Carinthia and near Lienz, in Austria. Their leaders included  Ataman Pavlov (ru, died in 1944), Peter Krasnov, Vyacheslav Naumenko, Timofey Domanov, Sultan Kelech Ghirey, and Andrei Shkuro. These groups, estimated to number about 35,000 people, surrendered to the British in early May 1945, who handed all Cossacks and Caucasians (even if they were not Soviet citizens) to the Soviet NKVD within four weeks. Many Cossacks were executed in Judenburg and the remainder sent to the East.
 The XVth SS Cossack Cavalry Corps commanded by Helmuth von Pannwitz surrendered to the British near Volkermarkt, in Austria, on May 10, 1945. By the end of May, 17,702 soldiers, including their German officers, and some women and children, were handed over to the Soviet NKVD at Judenburg.
 The Russian Liberation Army found itself by the end of World War II near Prague. A part of it helped to liberate the city from the German occupation, only to fight alongside German troops days later to escape capture by the Red Army. Many, however, surrendered to the Red Army, others were hunted down, and some escaped to the Americans near Pilsen, only to be handed over to the Soviets. Vlasov, its commander, was arrested by the Americans and repatriated as well. Execution, torture, and labor camps awaited them.
 The 162nd Turkoman Division had been formed from men from the Caucasus and from Turkic land further east, and fought in Italy; its main body surrendered near Padua in May 1945. They were sent to a POW camp near Taranto and shipped to Odessa. They received 20-year terms of hard labor.
 With the surrender of Germany on May 8, 1945, large numbers of Russians were liberated, including POWs, Hiwis (volunteers in the Army), and slave laborers (Ostarbeiter). Those in areas under Soviet control came into Soviet possession directly. Those in areas controlled by the Western Allies were to be repatriated. By July 4, 1945, over 1.5 million Russians had been transferred by SHAEF as displaced persons (DPs) to the Soviet Occupation Zone.
 Operation Keelhaul was the final repatriation process that took place in Italy between August 14, 1946 and May 8–9, 1947.

While Tolstoy primarily discusses the reaction of the British and Americans to the Soviet requests for repatriation, he also describes the actions of other governments. Repatriation programs were enacted in Belgium, Finland, France, Holland, Norway, Sweden, and Switzerland. The only country known to have resisted requests to force unwilling Russians to become repatriated was Liechtenstein. He discusses reasons why governments were willing participants in the repatriation program, even when it was obvious that many Russians did not wish to return and that the fate of repatriates was death, torture, or forced labor. One issue for Western Allies was reciprocity, namely concern for their prisoners who had fallen into Soviet hands. While Tolstoy had access to British documents that were opened 30 years after World War II, he indicates Soviet documents remained sealed. Generally, on their side, agents from NKVD or SMERSH conducted the handling of the repatriates. Tolstoy, however, also obtained information from survivors and defectors. According to his estimate, based on data of a former NKVD officer, a total of 5.5 million Russians were repatriated from formerly occupied areas; of these 20% either received a death sentence or a 25-year labor camp sentence, 15–20% received sentences of 5 to 10 years, 10% were exiled for 6 years or more, 15% worked as conscripts in assigned areas and not allowed to return home subsequently, and 15–20% were allowed to return home but remained ostracized. The remainder was "wastage", that is people who died in transit, got lost, or escaped.

Tolstoy estimates that overall, two or more million Soviet nationals were repatriated. Repatriation efforts were most ardently followed by the British, while American forces were conciliatory with Soviet demands but Tolstoy noted increasing reluctance.  While the Soviet government also attempted to "repatriate" people of countries it conquered in and after 1939, the Western Allies resisted returning possibly millions of people from Bessarabia, Estonia, Latvia, Lithuania, and Poland.

Reactions
In the American edition that appeared after the British one, Tolstoy added a postscript that indicates some initial responses to the book and added some additional notes. Tolstoy followed his investigations with Stalin's Secret War (1981) and The Minister and the Massacres (1986). In these books, he deals more with the issue that in May 1945 British forces in Carinthia handed over emigres from Russia who were not Soviet citizens and, in the latter, chronicles also the British release of the anti-communist Slovenes and Croats to Josip Broz Tito's Yugoslav government. The last of the three books was particularly controversial, and it led to a 1989 libel suit in which Lord Aldington prevailed against Tolstoy’s charge that he was a "war criminal".

Alistair Horne, Macmillan's biographer, describes Victims of Yalta as "an honorable, and profoundly disturbing book which pulled no punches", but he was highly critical of Tolstoy's follow-up books, arguing that their increasing stridency and tendency to twist the evidence to fit a preconceived theory effectively vitiated them as serious works of history. Horne also notes that Macmillan, then 90, felt he was too old to initiate a suit to defend himself. Horne's final judgement is that fresh evidence, uncovered after the publication of Victims of Yalta, proves Tolstoy's notion of a conspiracy was not just wrong-headed, but outright wrong.

See also
Western betrayal
Forest brothers
Aftermath of World War II

References

Bibliography

External links
 Essay by N.Tolstoy from December 1988

1977 non-fiction books
History books about the Soviet Union
History books about World War II
20th-century history books
Post–World War II forced migrations